Tony Johnson is an American football coach.  He served as the head football coach at Bethany College in Lindsborg, Kansas from 2004 to 2005, compiling a record of 5–14.

Head coaching record

College

References

External links
 TonyJohnsonMotivates.com

Year of birth missing (living people)
Living people
Bethany Swedes football coaches